Vahan Juharyan (born 26 January 1978) is an Armenian wrestler. He won the silver medal at the 1997 World Wrestling Championships in Wrocław and gold medal at the 2004 European Wrestling Championships in Haparanda.

Juharyan was a member of the Armenian Greco-Roman wrestling team at the 2010 Wrestling World Cup. The Armenian team came in third place.

References

External links
 TheMat.com

1978 births
Living people
Sportspeople from Gyumri
Armenian male sport wrestlers
World Wrestling Championships medalists
European Wrestling Championships medalists
20th-century Armenian people
21st-century Armenian people